Francisco Negrin (born June 5, 1963) is a creative director working in opera, as well as in the world of stadium and arena based shows and other events. He is considered to be one of the best directors in the world. He is known for his musical and cinematic approach, and for his success with projects considered to be difficult to stage. In opera, he is seen as a specialist of both baroque and contemporary music and his work in all media is characterised by a highly integrated use of dance and technology as part of the dramaturgy and a keen understanding of the culture being treated.

Biography
Negrin was born in Mexico City, the son of Spaniard Francisco Negrin Diaz and Greek-Hawaiian Catherine Negrin (née Maggioros). He is the great-grandson of Juan Negrín López, President of the Second Spanish Republic. When he was 9 years old, the family moved from Mexico to the family home in Antibes, France.

After completing his secondary studies at the Lycée in Antibes (graduating with a mathematics and physics Baccalaureate), Negrin studied literature and film at the university of Aix-en-Provence, France, while attending singing lessons at the Conservatoire d'Aix-en-Provence, where he was first in contact with the world of opera. He worked as an extra and later as an assistant director and stage manager at the Aix-en-Provence Festival (1982–83). There he met Swiss stage director , who became his mentor and teacher. Negrin assisted him on many productions, including Seattle Opera's Ring cycle. Rochaix introduced him to the artist agent Lies Askonas. She recommended Negrin to Gerard Mortier who hired him as a staff assistant director at La Monnaie/De Munt in Brussels for two seasons (1984-1986). There he continued to learn his trade assisting the directors Patrice Chéreau, John Cox and Maurice Béjart. After leaving La Monnaie in 1986, Negrin moved to London where he started his career as a director. He has lived in Barcelona since 2003.

Career
Negrin and conductor Peter Ash put together a performing version of the unfinished La chute de la maison Usher by Debussy, which they staged at Christ Church, Spitalfields, in London. This performance came to the attention of the Southbank Centre which commissioned a production of the reconstruction for the Queen Elizabeth Hall in 1989. That was the start of an international directing career which, in opera, includes the following productions:

Opera productions

Other work

In 2021 Negrin wrote and directed a new production for Holiday on Ice: “A New Day”. The tour was stopped by COVID lockdowns and postponed to 2022.

In 2020 Francisco Negrin directed the tableau vivant for Louis Vuitton’s Paris fashion week autumn/winter womenswear show.

Francisco Negrin has been a creative consultant for Balich Worldwide Shows, for whom he has conceived stadium, arena and other commercial events and shows.

In 2019 Negrin conceived, wrote and directed the opening ceremony of the Lima Panamerican Games and was the creative supervisor for the closing and also for the Parapan American Games ceremonies. These ceremonies had a huge impact in the country.

In 2017 Francisco Negrin conceived and directed the shows for the Dubai World Cup at the Meydan Rececourse. The shows took place in a performance area 1 kilometer wide with a 100 meter wide LED screen and 87 drones.

He also conceived and directed the opening ceremony of the 5th Asian Indoor and Martial Arts Games in Ashgabat, Turkmenistan. A massive stadium show involving more than 6000 performers.

He also wrote and directed the 2014 and 2015 Intimissimi On Ice shows at the Roman arena in Verona which featured opera singers, skating champions such as Stéphane Lambiel and Carolina Kostner and pop stars Pharrell Williams, Anastacia and Ellie Goulding.

Negrin worked with the rock band OK Go, conceiving the staging for a performance at London's The Roundhouse, using an installation by architect Ron Arad called "Curtain Call". But the show was cancelled before opening.

In 2002, Francisco Negrin was a member of the board for London-based contemporary dance company Walker Dance.

Negrin collaborated with choreographer Fin Walker, composer Ben Park and film animator Damian Gascoigne on a site-specific performance called Two Stations, at the Queen Elisabeth Hall in London, commissioned by the Southbank Centre's Great Outdoors festival in 1994.

Negrin did the editing and visual effects for the music video of the song "Slow Me" for singer Mudibu, directed by Dean Loxton.

Negrin has given several master classes for opera singers, aiming to develop their acting skills. A series of master classes was devised by Negrin for the Royal Danish Opera Academy in Copenhagen in which the emphasis was on the whole process of conceiving and putting on a show, with participating singers having to write, stage, light and perform their own mini-operas or plays.

Collaborators
Francisco Negrin has worked in close collaboration with several design teams including:
Set and costume designers: Louis Desiré, Es Devlin, Rifail Ajdarpasic and Ariane Isabell Unfried, Nigel Lowery, John Conklin, Paul Steinberg, Anthony Baker, Jonathan Morell, Carol Bailey, Allen Moyer, Tobias Hoheisel, Paco Azorín, Stufish, Gioforma, Thanassis Demiris, Palle Steen Christensen, Pepe Corzo and Carl Fillon.
Lighting designers: Bruno Poet, Wolfgang Goebbel, Allen Hahn, Frank Evin, Davy Cunningham, Duane Schuler, Joan Sullivan, Robert Wierzel, Heather Carson, Jennifer Tipton, Mikki Kunttu, Durham Marenghi and Adam Bassett.
Choreographers: Fin Walker, Ana Yepes, Thomas MacManus, Nathan Clarke, Ran Arthur Braun, Dimitra Kritikidi and Vania Masías Málaga.
Video artists: Joan Rodón, Luke Halls and Charles Darby

Television and DVD

The following productions have been broadcast on TV: Venus, Les contes d'Hoffman, Una cosa rara (Drottninholm version), Una cosa rara (Valencia version) and Intimissimi on ice 2014 and 2105 were both broadcast in Italy and Spain.

The following productions have been released on DVD: I puritani (DVD and Blu-ray), L'arbore di Diana, Giulio Cesare (Sydney version), Giulio Cesare (Copenhagen version), Partenope (Copenhagen version), Norma (Barcelona version) and Il Trovatore (Macerata version).

Awards
Negrin's production of Orlando at The Royal Opera House in London was nominated for two Laurence Olivier Awards in 2004: "Best new opera production" and "Outstanding achievement in opera" (for Bejun Mehta).

His production of Giulio Cesare for Opera Australia won several Green Room Awards in 1995, including best opera director and best opera production.

Negrin's second production of Giulio Cesare, the one for the Royal Danish opera in Copenhagen, won the  Award for best opera production in 2003. And Negrin's production of Partenope for the same company was nominated for the award in 2009.

References

External links

Francisco Negrín Operabase
Artist profile at HarrisonParrott Management
Artist profile at AMCK Management

1963 births
Living people
People from Mexico City
Spanish opera directors
Musicians from Barcelona